The Presidential Salute Battery (Guns Platoon) is an element of the 3rd United States Infantry Regiment. The battery, which is staffed by soldiers qualified as MOS 11C (Mortarman), is chiefly responsible for firing ceremonial gun-salute honors in general officer funerals and retirements, on state occasions, and in a tactical capacity, is tasked with providing the regiment's indirect fire support.

History
Activated in 1953, the Presidential Salute Battery is equipped with ten 3-inch Gun M5s which have been mounted on M6 howitzer carriages. The M5 is a World War II-era anti-tank weapon. 

The battery renders gun salutes according to a customary order of arms which is 21 rounds for heads of state (including the president of the United States and former presidents); 19 for the vice-president of the United States, foreign chiefs of government, and members of the cabinet of the United States; and 17, 15, 13, and 11 for flag officers of the rank of O-10, O-9, O-8, and O-7, respectively. of only the Army, Marines, and Navy.

Under an 1890 regulation issued by the United States Department of War, the "Salute to the Union" consists of one round for every state of the United States, or 50 rounds since 1959; it is fired by the battery annually at noon on U.S. Independence Day. The Presidential Salute Battery fires blank artillery rounds packed with a 1.5 pound powder charge.

Mission

Funerals 
The battery is assigned to Arlington National Cemetery for full honor burials of sitting and former presidents of the United States, sitting cabinet secretaries, and military flag officers, as well as wreath-laying ceremonies at the Tomb of the Unknowns . For funerals at Arlington it uses one of four firing positions, either from Sections 3, 4, and 28 of the cemetery on Miles, Dewey and Mitchell Drives respectively, or at Red Springs on McClellan Drive.

Public and military observances
The battery fires ceremonial gun salutes at events including the U.S. Army's weekly Twilight Tattoo, observances for Flag Day and Independence Day, and at the inauguration of a new president of the United States.

Military operations
In support of the 3rd Infantry Regiment's tactical responsibilities, platoon members operate the 81mm M252 mortar system, per the 11C MOS job assignment, as battalion weapons platoon for the regiment.

State and official visits
During the White House arrival ceremony at state and official visits, the battery fires gun salutes from a firing position in President's Park during the performance of the visiting state's national anthem.

See also
 21-gun salute

References

External links

Ceremonial units of the United States military
Military units and formations established in 1953
1953 establishments in the United States